The Digest, also known as the Pandects (adapted from  , "all-containing"), is a name given to a compendium or digest of juristic writings on Roman law compiled by order of the Byzantine emperor Justinian I in 530–533 AD. It is divided into 50 books.

History

The original Codex Justinianus was promulgated in April of 529 by the C. "Summa". This made it the only source of imperial law, and repealed all earlier codifications. However, it permitted reference to ancient jurists whose writings had been regarded as authoritative. Under Theodosus II's Law of Citations, the writings of Papinian, Paulus, Ulpian, Modestinus, and Gaius were made the primary juristic authorities who could be cited in court. Others cited by them also could be referred to, but their views had to be "informed by a comparison of manuscripts".

The principal surviving manuscript is the Littera Florentina of the late sixth or early seventh century. In the Middle Ages, the Digest was divided into three parts, and most of the manuscripts contain only one of these parts. The entire Digest was first translated into English in 1985 by the Scottish legal scholar Alan Watson.

The Digest was discovered in Amalfi in 1135, prompting a revival of learning of Roman law throughout Europe. Other sources claim it was discovered in 1070 and formed a major impetus for the founding of the first university in Europe, the University of Bologna (1088).

Conflicts of law
The codified authorities often conflicted. Therefore, Justinian ordered these conflicts to be settled and fifty of these were published as the "quinquaginta decisiones" (fifty decisions). Soon after, he further decreed that the works of these ancient writers, which totalled over 1,500 books, be condensed into fifty books. These were to be entitled, in Latin, Digesta (Ordered abstracts) or, in Greek, Πανδέκται Pandectae ("Encyclopedia"). In response to this order of December 15, 530 ("Deo auctore"), Tribonian created a commission of sixteen members to do the work—one government official, four professors, and eleven advocates.

The commission was given the power to condense and alter the texts in order to simplify, clarify, and eliminate conflicts among them. The Digest's organization is complex: each of the fifty books is divided into several titles, each containing several extracts, and many of the extracts have several parts or paragraphs.  Research in the modern era has created a highly probable picture of how the commission carried out its task.

Contents
Approximately two-fifths of the Digest consists of the writings of Ulpian, while some one-sixth belongs to Paulus. The work was declared to be the sole source of non-statute law: commentaries on the compilation were forbidden, or even the citing of the original works of the jurists for the explaining of ambiguities in the text. One opinion written by Paulus at the beginning of the Crisis of the Third Century in 235 AD about the Lex Rhodia ("Rhodian law") articulates the general average principle of marine insurance established on the island of Rhodes in approximately 1000 to 800 BC as a member of the Doric Hexapolis, plausibly by the Phoenicians during the proposed Dorian invasion and emergence of the purported Sea Peoples during the Greek Dark Ages that led to the proliferation of the Doric Greek dialect. The law of general average constitutes the fundamental principle that underlies all insurance. Also, in an opinion dated to approximately 220 AD during the reign of Elagabalus (218–222) of the Severan dynasty, Ulpian compiled a life table that would later be submitted in an article to the Journal of the Institute of Actuaries in 1851 by future U.S. Supreme Court Associate Justice Joseph P. Bradley (1870–1892), a former actuary for the Mutual Benefit Life Insurance Company.

Editions

Alan Watson completed a four volume translation of the Digest in 1985, based on the Latin text published by Theodor Mommsen in 1878.

See also
 Byzantine law
 Civil code
 Corpus Juris Canonici
 Corpus Juris Civilis
 International Roman Law Moot Court
 Law of Citations
 List of Roman laws

Notes

References
Tony Honoré, 'Justinian's Codification' in The Oxford Classical Dictionary 803-804. (Simon Hornblower and Antony Spawforth eds. 3rd rev. ed 2003)
HF Jolowicz and Nicholas, Historical Introduction to the Study of Roman Law 452 (3rd ed. 1972)
CCM Radding and A Ciaralli, The Corpus Iuris Civilis in the Middle Ages: Manuscripts and Transmissions from the Sixth Century to the Juristic Revival (2007)
T Mommsen, P Krueger and A Watson, The Digest of Justinian (1985)
F Mackeldey Handbook of the Roman Law
FH Blume, C. Summa
Bernardo Moraes, Manual de Introdução ao Digesto (2017), 620pp.

External links

Latin text at Bibliotheca Augustana
SP Scott, The Civil Law (1932) which contains the Digest's 50 volumes.
Roman Law Resources, maintained by Prof Ernest Metzger.
The Roman Law Library, Professor Yves Lassard and Alexandr Koptev.
WW Buckland, A Text-Book of Roman Law from Augustus to Justinian (1921) though there were new editions by Peter Stein in 1963 and 1975.
 

Roman law
Byzantine law
Latin prose texts
6th-century Latin books
Law books
6th century in law
Justinian I
6th century in the Byzantine Empire